Pod Rocks is a small compact group of rocks, lying  west of Millerand Island in Marguerite Bay, off the west coast of Graham Land. First roughly surveyed in 1936 by the British Graham Land Expedition (BGLE) under Rymill. The rocks were visited and resurveyed in 1949 by the Falkland Islands Dependencies Survey (FIDS), who established a sealing camp there. The name, proposed by FIDS, derives from the old sealers' term "pod," meaning a group of seals hauled ashore.

Rock formations of Graham Land
Fallières Coast